Rudolf Brinkmann may refer to:
 Rudolf Brinkmann (economist)
 Rudolf Brinkmann (baritone)